Federico Hernán Álvarez (born 7 August 1994) is an Argentine professional footballer who plays as a left-back for Greek Super League club Asteras Tripolis.

Career
Álvarez's career started in 2012 with Argentine Primera División side Belgrano. He was an unused substitute four times during the 2012–13 season, prior to making his first-team debut on 2 September 2013 in a win against Atlético de Rafaela. In August 2015, Álvarez appeared in the Copa Sudamericana for the first time in a game versus Lanús. By the end of the 2016 campaign, Álvarez made 49 appearances for Belgrano. In his 2016–17 season opener against Boca Juniors, he received his first career red card. On 31 July 2017, Álvarez was loaned to Quilmes of Primera B Nacional.

Personal life
Álvarez is the nephew of fellow footballer Matías Suárez and cousin of Gastón Álvarez Suárez, another footballer.

Career statistics
.

References

External links

1994 births
Living people
Footballers from Córdoba, Argentina
Argentine footballers
Association football defenders
Super League Greece players
Argentine Primera División players
Primera Nacional players
Asteras Tripolis F.C. players
Club Atlético Belgrano footballers
Quilmes Atlético Club footballers
Argentine expatriate footballers
Argentine expatriate sportspeople in Greece
Expatriate footballers in Greece
21st-century Argentine people